

46001–46100 

|-id=053
| 46053 Davidpatterson ||  || David Patterson, American amateur astronomer, founding member of the Huachuca Astronomy Club in Arizona. || 
|-id=076
| 46076 Robertschottland ||  || Robert Schottland (born 1948) is a software and database developer who has made significant contributions to projects at Lowell Observatory in Flagstaff, AZ. These projects include observational programs to study near-Earth asteroids and meteors, and Lowell's "astorb" database of minor planets. || 
|-id=083
| 46083 Aaronkingery ||  || Aaron Kingery (born 1987) is an astronomer at NASA's Marshall Space Flight Center. He develops meteor observation hardware and meteor analysis software for NASA's meteor programs. || 
|-id=095
| 46095 Frédérickoby ||  || Frédéric Édouard Koby (1890–1969), Swiss ophthalmologist and paleontologist, specialist on the cave bear. He is the son of Frédéric Louis Koby (1852–1930) || 
|}

46101–46200 

|-id=110
| 46110 Altheamoorhead ||  || Althea Moorhead (born 1981) is a research astronomer at NASA. She helps to bridge the gap between meteor astronomy and engineering by characterizing meteoroid populations, modeling their dynamics, and developing software that can be used to predict impacts on spacecraft. || 
|}

46201–46300 

|-id=208
| 46208 Gicquel ||  || Adeline Gicquel Brodtke (born 1985) is a French scientist, working as a researcher at the University of Maryland. She specializes in modeling gas and dust activity of comets. || 
|-id=277
| 46277 Jeffhall ||  || Jeffrey C. Hall, director of Lowell Observatory || 
|-id=280
| 46280 Hollar ||  || Václav Hollar, 17th-century Czech painter and graphic artist || 
|}

46301–46400 

|-id=308
| 46308 Joelsercel ||  || Joel C. Sercel (born 1960) is a leader in the development of technology to extract Lunar and asteroidal resources. He has had a long career in advanced engineering with JPL, the USAF, aerospace consulting, and teaching at Caltech. || 
|-id=392
| 46392 Bertola ||  || Francesco Bertola (born 1937), Italian author, professor of astrophysics and director of the astronomy department at Padua University. His research includes expert in galactic structure and dynamics. He is also known for the discovery of the new class of type Ib supernovae || 
|}

46401–46500 

|-id=441
| 46441 Mikepenston ||  || Michael Penston (1943–1990), a British observational astronomer at Royal Greenwich Observatory, who studied NGC 4151 and determined the mass of the central object. The name for this minor planet was proposed by Keith Tritton (see below). || 
|-id=442
| 46442 Keithtritton ||  || Keith Tritton (born 1944), a British astronomer; the discoverers recently found his lost short-period comet D/1978 C1, now known as 157P/Tritton || 
|}

46501–46600 

|-id=513
| 46513 Ampzing || 1972 FC || Samuel Ampzing, Dutch minister, poet and purist || 
|-id=514
| 46514 Lasswitz || 1977 JA || Kurd Lasswitz, German philosopher and poet || 
|-id=539
| 46539 Viktortikhonov ||  || Viktor Vasilyevich Tikhonov (1930–2014), an outstanding Soviet ice hockey player and coach. || 
|-id=563
| 46563 Oken ||  || Lorenz Oken, German professor of medicine and Romantic natural philosopher, founder of the Gesellschaft Deutscher Naturforscher und Ärzte (Society of German Naturalists and Physicians) || 
|-id=568
| 46568 Stevenlee || 1991 SL || Steven Lee, Australian astronomer, discoverer of comet C/1999 H1 (Lee) || 
|-id=580
| 46580 Ryouichiirie || 1992 GC || Ryouichi Irie (born 1949), a Japanese amateur astronomer in Toyooka city, Hyogo prefecture, and an independent discoverer of C/1988 P1 (Machholz). || 
|-id=592
| 46592 Marinawatanabe || 1992 YP || Marina Watanabe (1990–2019), together with her mother Yoshie, acted as a manager/producer for her father, Junichi Watanabe on his outreach activities in astronomy and planetary sciences. || 
|-id=595
| 46595 Kita-Kyushu ||  || Kita-Kyushu, a city in Fukuoka prefecture, Japan || 
|-id=596
| 46596 Tobata || 1993 BD || Tobata, a ward of Kita-Kyushu City in Fukuoka prefecture, Japan || 
|}

46601–46700 

|-id=610
| 46610 Bésixdouze ||  || The number 46610 translates to the hexadecimal B612 (the French "bé-six-douze" stands for "b-six-twelve"), the designation of the fictitious minor planet on which Saint-Exupéry's Little Prince lived || 
|-id=632
| 46632 RISE ||  || The RISE (Research of Interior Structure and Evolution of solar system bodies) project of the National Astronomical Observatory of Japan aims to elucidate the origin and evolution of the Moon, planets and their moons mainly through geodetic approaches by space missions. || 
|-id=643
| 46643 Yanase || 1995 KM || Takashi Yanase, Japanese cartoonist || 
|-id=644
| 46644 Lagia || 1995 OF || Livia "Lagia" Giacomini, Italian scientific journalist and astrophysicist || 
|-id=669
| 46669 Wangyongzhi || 1996 LK || Wang Yongzhi, Chinese aerospace expert which was the first chief architect of China's crewed space flight || 
|-id=686
| 46686 Anitasohus ||  || From 1974 to 2006, Anita Sohus (born 1951) undertook multiple roles on Voyager and Galileo in JPL's Outreach and Education Office, communicating NASA's science results to the science community and the public || 
|-id=689
| 46689 Hakuryuko ||  || Hakuryuko is the name of the marsh located in the northeastern part of Akayu hot spring, Nanyo city, Yamagata. || 
|-id=691
| 46691 Ghezzi ||  || Pierangelo Ghezzi (born 1956), an Italian amateur astronomer and discoverer of minor planets who is also an observer of variable stars. || 
|-id=692
| 46692 Taormina ||  || Taormina, Sicily † || 
|}

46701–46800 

|-
| 46701 Interrante ||  || Giorgio Interrante (born 1969) an Italian amateur astronomer and member of the astrometry team at Beppe Forti Astronomical Observatory  in Montelupo Fiorentino, Tuscany. || 
|-id=702
| 46702 Linapucci || 1997 DX || Lina Pucci, mother of the first discoverer || 
|-id=719
| 46719 Plantade || 1997 PJ || François de Plantade, French cartographer and astronomer, founder of the Société royale des sciences de Montpellier (Royal Society of Sciences of Montpellier) || 
|-id=720
| 46720 Pierostroppa ||  || Piero Stroppa, Italian physics teacher and astronomy populariser, who worked for the magazine Nuovo Orione || 
|-id=722
| 46722 Ireneadler ||  || Irene Adler, heroine of the Sherlock Holmes story A Scandal in Bohemia || 
|-id=727
| 46727 Hidekimatsuyama ||  || Hideki Matsuyama (born 1970) became a member of the Nanyo Astronomical Lovers Club in 1990 and actively popularizes astronomy || 
|-id=731
| 46731 Prieurblanc ||  || Pierre Prieur-Blanc, one of the three people involved in the construction of the Observatoire de Paris' coronagraphic station on Pic de Château-Renard at Saint-Véran in the Hautes-Alpes || 
|-id=737
| 46737 Anpanman || 1997 VO || Anpanman, Takashi Yanase's cartoon hero, whose head is a bun filled with sweet bean jam || 
|-id=793
| 46793 Phinney || 1998 JP || Jeffrey L. Phinney, American astronomer || 
|-id=796
| 46796 Mamigasakigawa || 1998 KU || Mamigasakigawa is the river that flows through the center of Yamagata City. It is a branch of the Mogami River || 
|}

46801–46900 

|-id=824
| 46824 Tambora ||  || Mount Tambora on the island of Sumbawa (Indonesia) is an active volcano that exploded in April 1815. It was the most powerful eruption in recorded history, and resulted in a brief period of significant worldwide climate change, including the "Year without a Summer" (1816). || 
|-id=829
| 46829 McMahon ||  || Jay W. McMahon (born 1982) has carried out fundamental research on the dynamics and evolutionary behavior of binary asteroids. His work has laid the foundation for a rigorous understanding of the Binary YORP effect and the determination of material parameters of binary asteroids based on remote observations. || 
|}

46901–47000 

|-id=920
| 46920 Suzanedwards ||  || Suzan Edwards (born 1951) is the L. Clark Seelye Professor of Astronomy at Smith College. Edwards studies and has made significant contributions to the understanding of the formation of stars, the evolution of planet-forming disks, and the role played by disk- and stellar-driven winds during the early phases of stellar evolution. || 
|-id=977
| 46977 Krakow ||  || Krakow, Poland || 
|}

References 

046001-047000